Fort Abbas railway station is located in  Pakistan.

See also
 List of railway stations in Pakistan
 Pakistan Railways

References

External links

Railway stations in Bahawalnagar District
Railway stations on Bahawalnagar–Fort Abbas Branch Line